The Midshipmaid is a 1933 comedy novel by the British writer Ian Hay. It is based on his 1931 play The Midshipmaid, co-written with Stephen King-Hall, about the visit of an economic expert to the British fleet to see what cuts can be made and the adventurous flirtation of his daughter with the ship's officers.

References

Bibliography
 George Watson & Ian R. Willison. The New Cambridge Bibliography of English Literature, Volume 4. CUP, 1972.

1933 British novels
Novels by Ian Hay
Novels based on plays
Hodder & Stoughton books